Slobodan Soro (Serbian Cyrillic: Слободан Соро; born December 23, 1978) is a Serbian-born Brazilian water polo goalkeeper.

As a member of the Serbia men's national water polo team at the 2008 Beijing Olympics and the 2012 London Olympics, he won the bronze medal in both of those Olympics. With Serbia he won the 2012 Men's European Water Polo Championship. It was his second gold medal in the competition. In 2011 he won the National Championship and National Cup of Serbia, LEN Euroleague, LEN Supercup and Eurointer League with Partizan Raiffeisen.

In 2015 he became a Brazilian naturalized citizen and was a member of the Brazil national team that competed at the 2016 Rio Olympics. He was the top goalkeeper at the 2016 Olympics, with 81 saves.

Club career
Slobodan Soro played for numerus clubs, including VK Vojvodina, VK Beograd, VK Bečej, VK Dinamo, PVK Jadran, VK Partizan, Rari Nantes Savona, CN Sabadell, CR Flamengo, Shturm 2002, Botafogo and now S.S. Lazio.

VK Partizan
In July 2010, the goalkeeper of VK Partizan and Serbian national team, signed a new two-year contract with Serbian champions. Partizan had financial problems, so that at one time Soro's stay at the club was questioned, but in the end it was all denied by him signing a new contract.

National career

2012 Samartzidis Cup
From 9 to 11 January 2012. Soro competed with his national team on the Greek island of Chios in the Samaridis Cup which was more a like preparation tournament for the upcoming 2012 European Championship held in Eindhoven. He and his team-mates finished second behind the Montenegrins on goal difference. However, Soro was named as the best goalkeeper of the tournament.

2012 Eindhoven
On 16 January, at the European Championship Soro had a brilliant game making 14 saves in the first game in an 8–5 win against Spain. On 29 January, Soro won the European Championship with his national team beating in the final Montenegro by 9–8. Unlike in the semifinal game against Italy were Soro was substituted by Branislav Mitrović because of the poor play, he absolutely dominated on the goal of Serbia in the final match. This was his second gold and overall fourth European medal.

Honours

Club
VK Bečej
 National Championship of Yugoslavia (1): 1999–2000
 National Cup of Yugoslavia (1): 1999–2000
 LEN Euroleague  (1):  1999–2000
VK Partizan
 National Championship of Serbia (3): 2008–09, 2009–10, 2010–11
 National Cup of Serbia (4): 2008–09, 2009–10, 2010–11, 2011–12
 LEN Euroleague  (1):  2010–11
 LEN Supercup  (1):  2011
 LEN Cup  (1):  1997–98
 Eurointer League (2): 2010, 2011
Botafogo
 National Championship of Brazil (1): 2015
 Rio de Janeiro State Championship (1): 2016
 South America Championship (1): 2017

Individual
FINA World Cup Best Goalkeeper (1): 2010 Oreada
FINA World League Best Goalkeeper (1): 2011 Firenze
Samaridis Cup Best Goalkeeper (1): 2012 Chios
 Serbia's sport association "May Award" : 2012

See also
 Serbia men's Olympic water polo team records and statistics
 Brazil men's Olympic water polo team records and statistics
 List of Olympic medalists in water polo (men)
 List of men's Olympic water polo tournament goalkeepers
 List of world champions in men's water polo
 List of World Aquatics Championships medalists in water polo

References

External links

 

1978 births
Living people
Sportspeople from Novi Sad
Serbian male water polo players
Serbian expatriate sportspeople in Brazil
Brazilian people of Serbian descent
Brazilian male water polo players
Water polo goalkeepers
Water polo players at the 2008 Summer Olympics
Water polo players at the 2012 Summer Olympics
Water polo players at the 2016 Summer Olympics
Medalists at the 2008 Summer Olympics
Medalists at the 2012 Summer Olympics
Olympic bronze medalists for Serbia in water polo
Olympic water polo players of Brazil
World Aquatics Championships medalists in water polo
European champions for Serbia
Competitors at the 2009 Mediterranean Games
Mediterranean Games medalists in water polo
Mediterranean Games gold medalists for Serbia
Water polo players at the 2019 Pan American Games
Pan American Games medalists in water polo
Pan American Games bronze medalists for Brazil
Medalists at the 2019 Pan American Games